The 1975 Argentine Grand Prix was a Formula One motor race held at Buenos Aires on 12 January 1975. It was race 1 of 14 in both the 1975 World Championship of Drivers and the 1975 International Cup for Formula One Manufacturers. It was the twelfth Argentine Grand Prix and only the second to be held on the lengthened six kilometre version of the race track that runs out towards Curvon Salotto around the lake which lies to the north-east of the circuit.

The race was won for the second time by Brazilian driver Emerson Fittipaldi driving a McLaren M23. He took a six-second victory over James Hunt in his Hesketh 308. Carlos Reutemann scored his best result to that time on his home race finishing third in his Brabham BT44B.

Race summary 

The close season had been fairly quiet – Jochen Mass had replaced Denny Hulme at McLaren, John Watson had joined Surtees and Mike Wilds, Rolf Stommelen and Jacques Laffite were confirmed at BRM, Hill and Williams respectively.

March had announced their retirement, but then in a dramatic U-turn confirmed their entry for 1975 with Vittorio Brambilla and Lella Lombardi.

There were contractual wrangles with Ronnie Peterson, reportedly discontent at Lotus and it was uncertain up until the start of practice whether he would be driving for them or Shadow.

Jean-Pierre Jarier proved the Shadow's effectiveness, putting in the fastest ever lap of the circuit, averaging 122 mph to gain his first pole from Carlos Pace and Carlos Reutemann.

However it was all in vain. On the warm-up lap, his crown-wheel-and-pinion stripped, leaving him a non-starter. Local hero Reutemann gratefully accepted the lead from Pace. James Hunt driving the newest Hesketh with new rubber suspension climbed from the 6th row up to third place, duelling with Niki Lauda. Jochen Mass and Jody Scheckter tangled. Meanwhile, John Watson was stranded with a loose fuel-pipe and was disqualified after attempting trackside repairs.

Wilson Fittipaldi crashed on lap 13, his car catching fire and requiring the fire engine to be deployed. By now, Hunt had passed Lauda and was catching the two Brabhams. Pace took the lead on lap 15, but spun on the very next lap. Reutemann having retaken the lead, was understeering badly and on lap 25 was passed by Hunt. There was a ferocious battle with Emerson Fittipaldi for the lead.

Classification

Qualifying

Race

Championship standings after the race

Drivers' Championship standings

Constructors' Championship standings

Note: Only the top five positions are included for both sets of standings.

References

Argentine Grand Prix
Argentine Grand Prix
Grand Prix
Argentine Grand Prix